Arctolamia villosa is a species of beetle in the family Cerambycidae. It was described by Gestro in 1888. It is known from Myanmar, China, and Thailand.

References

Lamiini
Beetles described in 1888